Biao Chen is a professor of electrical engineering and computer science at Syracuse University. He was named Fellow of the Institute of Electrical and Electronics Engineers (IEEE) in 2015 for "contributions to decentralized signal processing in sensor networks and interference management of wireless networks".

Early life and education 
Chen received B.E. and M.E. degrees in electrical engineering from Tsinghua University in 1992 and 1994, respectively. He got an M.S. in statistics and his Ph.D. in electrical engineering from the University of Connecticut.

Career 
After leaving Tsinghua University, Chen worked at AT&T in Beijing. He later did a postdoctoral fellowship at Cornell University. Chen has taught at Syracuse University since 2000, and has been the John E. and Patricia A. Breyer professor of electrical engineering since 2017. He has been area editor for the IEEE Transactions on Signal Processing and associate editor for the IEEE Communications Letters, the IEEE Transactions on Signal Processing, and the EURASIP Journal on Wireless Communications and Networking.

References

External links

20th-century births
Living people
Chinese engineers
University of Connecticut alumni
Syracuse University faculty
Fellow Members of the IEEE
Year of birth missing (living people)
Place of birth missing (living people)